Sports Division was one of the biggest sports retailers in the United Kingdom during the 1990s.

The company was set up by Sir Tom Hunter in 1984 to sell trainers, initially from the back of a van. Hunter subsequently borrowed £5,000 from his father and a further £5,000 from RBS to set up Sports Division. 

In November 1995, Hunter, along with business partner Philip Green, purchased larger rival Olympus Sports from Sears, and integrated them into the Sports Division brand.

In 1998, following a dramatic reduction in sales, Sports Division postponed coming to the market as planned. In July of that year, the business was sold to its main competitor, JJB Sports, for approximately £295 million.

References

1984 establishments in the United Kingdom
1998 disestablishments in the United Kingdom
Clothing retailers of the United Kingdom
Sporting goods retailers of the United Kingdom
Retail companies established in 1984
Retail companies disestablished in 1998
Defunct retail companies of the United Kingdom